The 2018 Asian Track Cycling Championships took place at the Velodrom Nasional Malaysia in Nilai, Malaysia from 16 to 20 February 2018.

Medal summary

Men

Women

Medal table

References

Results book

External links
Asian Cycling Federation
Results

Asian Cycling Championships
Asia
Seremban District
International cycle races hosted by Malaysia
Asian Cycling Championships
February 2018 sports events in Asia
February 2018 sports events in Malaysia